The 2011–12 PBA season was the 37th season of the Philippine Basketball Association. The season was formally opened on October 2, 2011 at the Smart Araneta Coliseum, and finished on August 5, 2012. The season used three-conference format, starting with the Philippine Cup, or the traditional All-Filipino Conference. The mid season Commissioner's Cup featured unlimited height limit for imports. The Governors' Cup became the third and final conference for this season.

The first activity of the season was the 2011 PBA Draft held on August 28, 2011, at the Robinsons Place Manila in Ermita, Manila.

Board of governors

Executive committee
 Chito Salud (Commissioner) 
 Mamerto Mondragon (Chairman, representing Rain or Shine Elasto Painters)
 Jose Bayani Baylon (Vice-Chairman, representing Powerade Tigers)
 Robert Non (Treasurer, representing Barangay Ginebra Kings)

Teams

Pre-season events

Player movement

Key transactions:
Trades:
Rain or Shine traded Doug Kramer and Josh Vanlandingham to Powerade for JR Quiñahan, Norman Gonzales and Powerade's 2013 and 2014 second round picks.
Barako Bull Energy, B-Meg Llamados, and Shopinas.com Clickers involved a three-way deal. Shopinas.com acquired Elmer Espiritu from Barako Bull and Brian Ilad from B-Meg, B-Meg received 5th pick overall Mark Barroca from Shopinas.com, and Barako Bull acquired Don Allado and future second round picks from B-Meg.

Notable occurrences
 The PBA board approved the sale of the Barako Bull Energy Boosters team franchise from Photokina Marketing to the Linaheim Corporate Services, owners of the Air21 Express. The team will now be known as the Shopinas.com Clickers.
 The Air21 Express will be renamed as Barako Bull Energy starting this season. The name change occurred after the Lina Group bought 49 percent stake of Energy Food and Drinks Inc., a subsidiary of Photokina Marketing and the exclusive distributor of Red Bull Energy Drink products in the Philippines. The "Energy Boosters" moniker will be dropped and instead the team will be known as "Energy", since there will be a conflict in using the "Boosters" moniker with the Petron Blaze Boosters.
 The PBA board approved the 20% salary cap increase and the standardization of game bonuses on September 8. The player salary cap was increased from P350,000 to P420,000. The proposals were approved at the heels of an outburst by Alaska Aces owner Fred Uytengsu during the press conference announcing Tim Cone's resignation as head coach of Alaska. Uytengsu commented that the league is not a level playing field, with some teams paying their players more than the monthly amount set by the PBA.

Coaching changes
Barako Bull Energy (formerly Air21 Express) hired Junel Baculi as head coach, who also was the head coach of the Barako Bull franchise that disbanded in 2010. Baculi will be replacing Bong Ramos, who will slide down as assistant coach.
On August 26, the Barangay Ginebra Kings appointed assistant coach Siot Tanquincen as co-head coach of the team, together with Jong Uichico.
On September 1, Alaska Aces coach Tim Cone requested to be released from his contract, which is set to expire in 2013. Assistant Joel Banal will take over as head coach.
 Two weeks after resigning as head coach of the Alaska Aces, Tim Cone was appointed as the new head coach of the B-Meg Llamados. Richard del Rosario, who was appointed as acting head coach in August  was demoted to assistant coach along with former B-meg head coach Jorge Gallent. Gallent later was reassigned as assistant coach of Petron Blaze.

Opening ceremonies
The season began on October 2 with the Rain or Shine Elasto Painters defeating the Barangay Ginebra Kings, 94–93.

The muses for the participating teams are as follows:

2011–12 Philippine Cup

Notable events

Elimination round

Playoffs

Quarterfinals 

|}

|}
*Team has twice-to-beat advantage. Team #1 only has to win once, while Team #2 has to win twice.

Semifinals 

|}

Finals 

|}
Finals MVP: Larry Fonacier (Talk 'N Text)
Best Player of the Conference: Gary David (Powerade)

2012 Blue vs. Green Dream Game

Rosters

Blue
Rabeh Al-Hussaini
Nonoy Baclao
JC Intal
Enrico Villanueva
Doug Kramer
LA Tenorio
Eric Salamat
Paolo Bugia
Wesley Gonzales
Larry Fonacier
Rich Alvarez
Magnum Membrere
Japeth Aguilar
Coach: Norman Black

Green
Mike Cortez
Willy Wilson
Ren-Ren Ritualo
Joseph Yeo
Tyrone Tang
Jerwin Gaco
Rico Maierhofer
Carlo Sharma
JVee Casio
Ryan Araña
Don Allado
Mark Cardona
Brian Ilad
Coach: Franz Pumaren

2012 Commissioner's Cup

After the PBA Philippine Cup Finals, the PBA is slated to return in the PBA Commissioner's Cup. This conference features imports for each team, with an unlimited height ceiling.

Notable events
 After a dismal finish in the Philippine Cup, the Lina Group of Companies announced that the Shopinas.com Clickers will be renamed as the Air21 Express starting in the Commissioner's Cup.
 On February 2, Coca-Cola Bottlers Philippines was rumored to sell its PBA team, the Powerade Tigers, to San Miguel Corporation, therefore allowing SMC to own and unprecedented 4 teams in the league. The rumors arose when it was revealed that certain factions in the Coca-Cola management have decided to sell the team. The next day, however, the trade rumors were debunked by Powerade manager JB Baylon.
 Due to being the Philippine national basketball team's naturalized player, Marcus Douthit's rights to be signed as an import (despite having naturalized Filipino status) were bidded on by the different PBA teams. The Air21 Express won the rights to sign Douthit after all the other teams passed. Douthit then agreed to play for Air21, with the rule that if he leaves Air21, he cannot play for any other team.

Player movement

Key transactions:
Trades:
 On January 27, 2012, sister teams Barangay Ginebra Gin Kings, B-Meg Llamados and third team Barako Bull Energy completed a five – player blockbuster deal. In the deal, B-MEG received Gin Kings forward JC Intal and a 2012 2nd round pick from Barako Bull that originally belonged to Air 21, formerly Shopinas.com. Ginebra got Llamados forward Kerby Raymundo and Energy rookie Dylan Ababou. Barako Bull ended up with Gin Kings veteran swingman Ronald Tubid and rookie Reil Cervantes, as well as a second round draft pick in 2014 from Ginebra. This marks the second time that Barako Bull has traded its top draft picks.
 On the same day, Air21 completed a four-man trade with the Meralco Bolts. Air21 acquired Nelbert Omolon and Mark Isip from Meralco in exchange for Mark Canlas, Dennis Daa, and a 2012 first-round draft pick that belonged to Meralco originally.

Coaching changes
 On January 11, after the Barangay Ginebra Kings lost their quarterfinal series against Rain or Shine Elasto Painters, coach Jong Uichico was revealed to have left Ginebra to join the Smart Gilas national basketball team coaches pool. Co-head coach Siot Tanquincen has become the sole head coach. On January 17, Uichico joined the Meralco Bolts as a team consultant.

Elimination round

Playoffs

Quarterfinals 

|}

Semifinals 

|}

Finals 

|}
Finals MVP: James Yap (B-Meg)
Best Player of the Conference: Mark Caguioa (Barangay Ginebra)
Best Import of the Conference: Denzel Bowles (B-Meg)

2012 Governors' Cup

Notable events

 The Barangay Ginebra Kings announced the retirement of Robert Jaworski's #7 jersey. The ceremony was held on July 8 before the start of the semifinals game between Barangay Ginebra and Petron Blaze.
 In commemoration of the jersey retirement of Robert Jaworski, the Barangay Ginebra Kings wore their throwback 1985 Ginebra San Miguel white jerseys (with slight modifications, specifically the replacement of the La Tondeña "G" logo with the current GSM yellow logo), on their semifinal game against Petron Blaze.
 PBA referee Peter Balao was suspended until the end of the season after a miss call of a three-second violation during the knockout game between the Barako Bull Energy and the Powerade Tigers.
 Following the loss of Barako Bull Energy against the Powerade Tigers in their knockout game, Don Allado of Barako Bull posted on his Twitter account his frustrations and mentioned that the PBA games are fixed. The Twitter posts were later deleted by Allado within a day and issued an apology to the league and the PBA officials. PBA Commissioner Chito Salud called Allado to his office to explain his accusations. Allado was later fined Php 500,000; Php 300,000 will go the PBA players educational trust fund and Php 200,000 to a charitable institution of his choice. Allado is also banned for one conference from all PBA related activities. The fine became the largest penalty for a player since Wynne Arboleda's fine after a violent altercation with a fan during their game against Smart Gilas in 2009.

Player movement

Key transactions:
Trades:
 On April 20, 2012 Powerade Tigers and Petron Blaze Boosters completed a five – player deal that would send Celino Cruz and Marcio Lassiter to Petron while Powerade receiving reigning Rookie of the Year Rabeh Al-Hussaini, Rey Guevarra and Lordy Tugade.
 On May 1, 2012 Barako Bull Energy has agreed on a trade that would send veteran Dorian Pena to the Petron Blaze Boosters in exchange for Carlo Sharma and Celino Cruz.
 On May 5, 2012 Powerade Tigers traded Doug Kramer to the Barako Bull Energy for backup forward Jondan Salvador and a first round pick in the upcoming draft.
 On May 11, 2012 Alaska Aces has agreed to trade center Jay-R Reyes to the Meralco Bolts in exchange for power forward Gabby Espinas. The transaction also gave the Aces the right to switch draft picks with Bolts in the upcoming draft.
 On May 29, 2012, Air 21 Express traded starting point guard RJ Jazul to the Alaska Aces in exchange for backup guard Eric Salamat and a 2012 second – round pick.

Coaching changes
 On April 16, 2012, coach Joel Banal of the Alaska Aces who was signed to a three-year deal, resigned from the team after losing the quarterfinal series against the Barako Bull Energy. Luigi Trillo, the son of Alaska team manager Joaqui Trillo, assistant coach of Alaska and former head coach of the PBA D-League Cebuana Lhuillier Gems, was appointed to replace Banal. Trillo also stated that he will reinstate the triangle offense in Alaska.

Elimination round

Semifinal round

Finals

|}
Finals MVP: Jeffrei Chan (Rain or Shine)
Best Player of the Conference: Mark Caguioa (Barangay Ginebra)
Best Import of the Conference: Jamelle Cornley (Rain or Shine)

Individual awards

Leo Awards

Most Valuable Player: Mark Caguioa (Barangay Ginebra)
Rookie of the Year: Paul Lee (Rain or Shine)
First Mythical Team:
 Mark Caguioa (Barangay Ginebra)
 Gary David (Powerade)
 Ranidel de Ocampo (Talk 'N Text)
 Arwind Santos (Petron Blaze)
 James Yap (B-Meg)
Second Mythical Team:
 Jayson Castro (Talk 'N Text)
 Paul Lee (Rain or Shine)
 Sonny Thoss (Alaska)
 Jeffrei Chan (Rain or Shine)
 Kelly Williams (Talk 'N Text)
All-Defensive Team:
 Marc Pingris (B-Meg)
 Doug Kramer (Barako Bull)
 Arwind Santos (Petron Blaze)
 Jireh Ibañes (Rain or Shine)
 Ryan Reyes (Talk 'N Text)
Most Improved Player: Jeffrei Chan (Rain or Shine)
Sportsmanship Award: JV Casio (Powerade)

Awards given by the PBA Press Corps
 Scoring Champion: Gary David (Powerade)
 Coach of the Year: Yeng Guiao (Rain or Shine)
 Mr. Quality Minutes: Larry Fonacier (Talk 'N Text)
 Comeback Player of the Year: Mark Caguioa (Barangay Ginebra)
 Executive of the Year: Raymund Yu and Terry Que (Rain or Shine)
 Defensive Player of the Year: Jireh Ibañes (Rain or Shine)
All-Rookie Team
Paul Lee (Rain or Shine)
JVee Casio (Powerade)
Marcio Lassiter (Petron Blaze)
Dylan Ababou (Barangay Ginebra)
James Sena (Air21)

Cumulative standings

Elimination rounds

Playoffs

References

External links
PBA.ph

 
PBA